The following list includes notable people who were born or have lived in Waukegan, Illinois. For a similar list organized alphabetically by last name, see the category page People from Waukegan, Illinois.

Artists and performers 

 Harrison Bankhead, jazz double bassist
 Jack Benny, comedian, actor, iconic radio and television personality
 Landis Blair, artist (The Hunting Accident, From Here to Eternity.)
 David Clennon, actor (Thirtysomething)
 J. Campbell Cory, cartoonist
 Steve DiGiorgio, musician
 Greg Drasler, artist
 Lee England Jr., violinist, composer, producer, singer
 Neil Flynn, actor (Scrubs, The Middle)
 Jon Michael Hill, actor (Detroit 1-8-7, Superior Donuts)
 Jason Kao Hwang, violinist and composer
 Mickey Kuhn, film actor of 1930s-1950s
 Norm Magnusson, artist, actor
 Justin Mentell, actor
 Joshua Mallett, musician
 Lori Peters, musician and former drummer of Skillet (band)
 Jerry Orbach, actor (Law & Order, Dirty Dancing)
 Adam Pearce ("Scrap Iron"), professional wrestler for Ring of Honor and the National Wrestling Alliance and producer for World Wrestling Entertainment.
 Bryan W. Simon, film and stage director, Along for the Ride, I'm No Dummy, Jay Johnson: The Two & Only!, Stage Two Theatre Company
 Marvin Smith, drummer on The Tonight Show
 Greg and Colin Strause, directors and visual effects supervisors of Aliens vs. Predator: Requiem and Skyline
 Brian Van Holt, actor

Journalism and writing 

 Diane Ackerman, author and naturalist
 Jim Bittermann, senior correspondent for CNN 
 Eleanor Taylor Bland, crime fiction author
 Ray Bradbury, author, iconic science-fiction writer, wrote about 1920's Waukegan as "Green Town" in many of his novels and short stories
 James Grippando, New York Times best-selling novelist
 Ward Just, writer
 Kim Stanley Robinson, science-fiction writer; born in Waukegan in 1952

Criminal justice

 Juan Rivera, wrongfully convicted of the 1992 murder of Holly Staker in Waukegan
 Alton Coleman, serial killer

Politicians and law 

 Jack E. Bairstow, Illinois legislator
 Reuben W. Coon, Illinois state senator
 Robert E. Coulson, Illinois legislator, lawyer, and mayor of Waukegan
 Elisha P. Ferry, first mayor of Waukegan, first governor of state of Washington
 Vic Kohring, Alaska legislator
 Thomas J. Moran, Chief Justice of the Illinois Supreme Court
 Kim Olson, military officer and political candidate
 Charles E. Redman, United States ambassador to Sweden and Germany

Sports

Baseball 

 Gary Bennett, catcher for the Los Angeles Dodgers
 Jarvis Brown, outfielder for the Minnesota Twins, San Diego Padres, Atlanta Braves and Baltimore Orioles
 Johnny Dickshot, outfielder for with Pittsburgh Pirates, New York Giants and Chicago White Sox
 Eric Eckenstahler, pitcher for the Detroit Tigers
 Jay Hook, pitcher for the Cincinnati Reds and New York Mets (winning pitcher in the first ever victory for the New York Mets)
 Bill Krueger, pitcher for eight MLB teams
 Jerry Kutzler, pitcher for the Chicago White Sox
 Doc Oberlander, pitcher for the Cleveland Blues
 Bob O'Farrell, catcher for the Chicago Cubs, St. Louis Cardinals and New York Giants, World Series champion, National League MVP and manager
 Ed Sedar, first base coach for the Milwaukee Brewers
 Scott Stahoviak, first baseman for the Minnesota Twins
 Jigger Statz, outfielder for the Chicago Cubs, New York Giants, Boston Red Sox and Brooklyn Robins
 Brian Traxler, first baseman for the Los Angeles Dodgers
 Renae Youngberg, third basewoman in the All-American Girls Professional Baseball League

Basketball 

 Shawn Marion, small and power forward for the Phoenix Suns, Miami Heat, Toronto Raptors, and Dallas Mavericks
 Billy McKinney, retired professional basketball player and former radio broadcaster
 Jerome Whitehead, center and power forward for several NBA teams

Football 

 Otto Graham, award-winning quarterback for the Cleveland Browns
Brian Schwenke current offensive lineman for the New England Patriots, born in Waukegan
 Michael Turner, running back for the Atlanta Falcons
 Mike Wagner, safety with the Pittsburgh Steelers; four time Super Bowl champion (IX, X, XIII, XIV)

Motorsports 
 John Morton, Champion Trans Am Series driver
 Ted Musgrave, American former stock car racing driver

Other 
 Rick Bay, served as head wrestling coach for Michigan (1970–74), and was later a college athletic director and professional sports executive

Other
 Richard E. Bush (1924–2004), Master Gunnery Sergeant in the United States Marine Corps and awardee of the Medal of Honor as a corporal for heroism on Okinawa during World War II. He resided in Waukegan in 1999.
 Althea Warren, president of the American Library Association, 1943–44

References

Waukegan
Waukegan